Eastover is a town in Richland County, South Carolina, United States. The population was 813 at the 2010 census, down from 830 in 2000. It is part of the Columbia, South Carolina, Metropolitan Statistical Area.

History
The J.A. Byrd Mercantile Store, Farmers and Merchants Bank Building, Good Hope Baptist Church, Goodwill Plantation, Kensington Plantation House, St. Phillip School, Saint Thomas' Protestant Episcopal Church, Claudius Scott Cottage, and Siloam School are listed on the National Register of Historic Places.

Geography
Eastover is located at  (33.877553, -80.694592).

Demographics

2020 census

As of the 2020 United States census, there were 614 people, 271 households, and 153 families residing in the town.

2000 census
At the 2000 census, there were 830 people, 307 households and 228 families residing in the town. The population density was 670.8 per square mile (258.4/km2). There were 357 housing units at an average density of 288.5 per square mile (111.2/km2). The racial makeup of the town was 92.26% African American, 6.87% White, 0.41% Asian, 0.12% from other races, and 0.48% from two or more races. Hispanic or Latino of any race were 0.24% of the population.

There were 307 households, of which 39.4% had children under the age of 18 living with them, 26.4% were married couples living together, 43.0% had a female householder with no husband present, and 25.7% were non-families. 23.5% of all households were made up of individuals, and 9.4% had someone living alone who was 65 years of age or older. The average household size was 2.64 and the average family size was 3.07.

32.4% of the population were under the age of 18, 10.6% from 18 to 24, 24.7% from 25 to 44, 21.7% from 45 to 64, and 10.6% who were 65 years of age or older. The median age was 32 years. For every 100 females, there were 81.2 males. For every 100 females age 18 and over, there were 67.0 males.

The median household income was $20,114 and the median family income was $19,844. Males had a median income of $23,250 versus $17,875 for females. The per capita income for the town was $9,304. About 36.9% of families and 37.3% of the population were below the poverty line, including 53.1% of those under age 18 and 30.0% of those age 65 or over.

Education
Richland County School District One operates area public schools.

Webber Elementary School is in Eastover. Eastover is zoned to Webber Elementary, Southeast Middle School, and Lower Richland High School.

Points of interest 
Eastover is the site of McEntire Joint National Guard Base and the headquarters for the South Carolina Air National Guard.

South Carolina Electric & Gas Company's Wateree Station 700 megawatt coal power plant is located here.

South Carolina's only national park, the Congaree National Park, is twelve miles southwest of Eastover.  Eastover is the closest municipality to the park.

Notable people

 Lewis C. Dowdy
 Sarah Mae Flemming
 Annie B. Martin
 Ashley Page
 Jacob Stroyer

Politics
Eastover is in South Carolina's 6th congressional district.

References

External links

 The official website of Eastover

Towns in Richland County, South Carolina
Towns in South Carolina
Columbia metropolitan area (South Carolina)